Palace Hotel, also known as the Eldredge Block, Excelsior Steam Laundry, Baltimore Hotel, Gardner Hotel, and Massey Hotel, is a historic hotel building located at Springfield, Greene County, Missouri. It was built about 1892, and is a two-story, Italianate influenced brick commercial building.  It has cast iron columns on the first floor storefront, a flat roof, and flat parapet.  It originally housed a laundry, then converted to a hotel in 1908.  It continued as a hotel until 1946.

It was added to the National Register of Historic Places in 2002.

References

Hotel buildings on the National Register of Historic Places in Missouri
Italianate architecture in Missouri
Hotel buildings completed in 1908
Buildings and structures in Springfield, Missouri
National Register of Historic Places in Greene County, Missouri